Parliamentary elections were held in Poland on 26 October 1952. They were the first elections to the Sejm, the parliament of the Polish People's Republic. The official rules for the elections were outlined in the new Constitution of the Polish People's Republic and lesser acts. The Front of National Unity received 99.8% of the vote and won every seat in the Sejm, a result that was to be repeated in parliamentary elections until 1989.

Background
The communists had spent the five years since winning the rigged 1947 elections tightening their grip on the country. A little more than a year after the election, what remained of the Polish Socialist Party (PPS), nominally a partner in the communist-dominated "coalition," merged with the communist Polish Workers' Party (PPR) to form the Polish United Workers' Party (PZPR). However, the merger was concluded almost entirely on PPR terms and by this time the PPS was largely subservient to the PPR. Despite this, former socialist Józef Cyrankiewicz remained as prime minister. By 1949, the remains of the Polish People's Party (PSL), which had led the opposition in 1947, had been emasculated when it was forced to merge with the splinter pro-communist People's Party to form the United People's Party (ZSL).

PPR leader Władysław Gomułka, who had been largely responsible for the PPR's heavy-handed suppression of opposition, believed he was now free to pursue a more independent course. He wanted to adapt the Soviet blueprint to Polish circumstances and considered himself to be both a communist and a Polish patriot. He was also wary of the Cominform, and opposed forced collectivization of agriculture. However, he was pushed out as party leader in 1948, accused of "rightist-nationalist deviation." He was succeeded by President Bolesław Bierut, a hardline Stalinist.

Conduct
The election set the tone for all subsequent elections held during Communist rule in Poland.  As would be the case with all future elections, only PZPR-allowed candidates participated, and the results were falsified as needed. Along with the 1947 election, the 1952 election is considered among the least free of elections held in communist Poland. This was typical of the era of Stalinization. The Bierut government, like its kindred regimes in the rest of the Soviet bloc, was determined to tighten its control over society as much as possible. All opposition parties had been either eliminated or driven underground by this time. The regime's opponents were persecuted. Voters were presented with a single list from the Front of National Unity (FJN), comprising the  PZPR and its two satellite parties, the Democratic Party (SD) and the ZSL.  The number of candidates permitted to run in the elections was equal to the number of seats in parliament.

There were 425 seats. The number of seats would be increased in the subsequent elections. In return for accepting the "leading role" of the PZPR—a condition of their continued existence—the minor parties in the Front received a fixed number of seats in the Sejm.

Results

The official results showed that 99.8% of the voters approved the FJN list. Candidates from the FJN parties took 91.2% of the Sejm seats, with 8.7% falling to nominal independents. Within the FJN, the PZPR won an absolute majority with 273 seats (64.2% total), its best result both in total number of seats and percentage of the Sejm controlled. However, as the other parties and "independents" were completely subservient to the PZPR, communist control of the Sejm was complete. In later years, the communist-dominated lists would be credited with between 98 and 99% of the vote, a practice continued until 1989.

The term of the Sejm elected in 1951 was due to end in 1956, but due to political shifts in Poland, the next elections took place in early 1957 in a more liberal atmosphere, although still not free.

References

Further reading
Jerzy Drygalski, Jacek Kwasniewski, No-Choice Elections, Soviet Studies, Vol. 42, No. 2 (Apr., 1990), pp. 295–315, JSTOR
George Sakwa, Martin Crouch, Sejm Elections in Communist Poland: An Overview and a Reappraisal, British Journal of Political Science, Vol. 8, No. 4 (Oct., 1978), pp. 403–424,

Poland
1952 in Poland
Parliamentary elections in Poland
Single-candidate elections
Elections in the Polish People's Republic
October 1952 events in Europe
1952 elections in Poland